Saint-Amans is a former commune in the Lozère department in southern France. On 1 January 2019, it was merged into the new commune Monts-de-Randon.

Geography
The Colagne flows westward through the southern part of the commune.

See also
Communes of the Lozère department

References

Saintamans